Pleiolama is an extinct genus of terrestrial herbivore in the family Camelidae, endemic to North America during the Pliocene.

Taxonomy
The genus Pleiolama was originally named Pliauchenia by Edward Drinker Cope in 1875.

Fossil distribution
Fossil distribution ranges from southern and north-central United States to Mexico.

References

Prehistoric camelids
Pliocene even-toed ungulates
Prehistoric mammals of North America
Prehistoric even-toed ungulate genera